George Dimitriou Seremetis (Greek: Γεώργιος Σερεμέτης) (1879 in Skamnia Elassonas - 1950) was a Greek lawyer.

Seremetis was born in 1879 in Skamnia Elassonas, then ruled by the Ottoman Empire. Shortly after his birth, the city of Larissa was liberated and his family moved there. In 1897, George Seremetis started his studies at a law school of the University of Athens. He graduated in 1902. He was a lawyer in Larissa for ten years.

He moved to Thessaloniki in 1913 when the city was liberated from Ottoman rule. From 1914 to 1922, he participated in the administration of the Thessaloniki bar association and from 1922 to 1926 he served as general secretary of the bar association. In 1922, Seremetis married Calliope Tatti and raised two children.

From 1926 to 1945, he was elected president of the Thessaloniki bar association by a large majority. He later succeeded with the help of D. Vlachos to establish a "Lawyers' Fund of Welfare" (Greek: Tαμείο Προνοίας Νομικών) in Thessaloniki. 
He died in 1950 of a heart attack.

References

Sources 
 Armenopoulos, p. 47 of 1993

1879 births
1950 deaths
National and Kapodistrian University of Athens alumni
20th-century Greek lawyers
Mayors of Thessaloniki
Greek collaborators with Nazi Germany
People from Larissa (regional unit)
Emigrants from the Ottoman Empire to Greece